Maymun, Maymoon, Maymoun (Arabic: ميمون maymūn) is an Arabic male given name generally implies "showing signs of future success" and also means "blessed, favorable, bringing happiness, of good omen, prosperous, auspicious, promising, blissful".

It may refer to:

People
 ʾAbū ʿImrān Mūsā bin Maymūn bin ʿUbaidallāh ʾal-Qurṭubī ʾal-ʾIsrāʾīlī (1135–1204), Spanish rabbi, physician, and philosopher
 Maimun Najar (15th century), Spanish/Algerian rabbi
 Nathan (bin Maymūn) Najar (15th century), a rabbi at Constantine, Algeria
 A'sha Maymūn Ibn Qays (c. 570 - 629), an Arabic Jahiliyyah poet
 Amr ibn Maymūn al-Awdi, one of the Ansar companions of the Islamic prophet Muhammad

Places
 Maimun, Iran, a village in Yazd Province, Iran
 Bani Maymun, a village in western central Yemen
 Istana Maimun ("Maimun Palace or Maimoon Palace"), a well-known landmark at Medan, North Sumatra
 Maimun Saleh Airport, a small airstrip in Sabang, Pulau Weh, Indonesia

See also 
 Üç Maymun, a 2008 Turkish film
 Māʾmūn (Mâmoûn, Mamon)
 Maimon
 Maiman